Maple Heights-Lake Desire is a census-designated place (CDP) in King County, Washington, United States. At the 2010 census, the population was 3,152.

Based on per capita income, one of the more reliable measures of affluence, Maple Heights-Lake Desire ranks 28th of 522 areas in the state of Washington to be ranked.

Geography
Maple Heights-Lake Desire is located in west-central King County at  (47.445557, -122.090771). It is bordered to the west by the Fairwood CDP, with which it shares a ZIP code, and to the south by the Shadow Lake CDP. Washington State Route 169, running through the Cedar River valley, forms the northern border, and the eastern boundary follows 196th Avenue SE. The southern border of the CDP is SE Petrovitsky Road.

Lake Desire is in the western part of the CDP, and Spring Lake is in the east. Cedar Mountain sits between the two lakes and contains a trail network. The neighborhood of Maple Valley Heights is in the northeast.

Demographics
As of the census of 2000, there were 2,569 people, 902 households, and 736 families residing in the CDP. The population density was 630.0 people per square mile (243.1/km2). There were 922 housing units at an average density of 226.1/sq mi (87.3/km2). The racial makeup of the CDP was 86.80% White, 1.28% African American, 1.48% Native American, 6.81% Asian, 0.19% Pacific Islander, 0.90% from other races, and 2.53% from two or more races. Hispanic or Latino of any race were 2.72% of the population.

There were 902 households, out of which 37.6% had children under the age of 18 living with them, 72.4% were married couples living together, 5.8% had a female householder with no husband present, and 18.4% were non-families. 13.4% of all households were made up of individuals, and 3.3% had someone living alone who was 65 years of age or older. The average household size was 2.84 and the average family size was 3.11.

In the CDP the population was spread out, with 26.8% under the age of 18, 5.1% from 18 to 24, 30.6% from 25 to 44, 28.9% from 45 to 64, and 8.6% who were 65 years of age or older. The median age was 39 years. For every 100 females there were 104.7 males. For every 100 females age 18 and over, there were 104.1 males.

The median income for a household in the CDP was $75,741, and the median income for a family was $78,848. Males had a median income of $56,761 versus $38,125 for females. The per capita income for the CDP was $33,209. About 0.6% of families and 2.2% of the population were below the poverty line, including 3.0% of those under age 18 and none of those age 65 or over.

References

Census-designated places in King County, Washington